Dambulla Viiking (abbreviated as DV) is a franchise cricket team which competed in the inaugural season of Lanka Premier League (LPL). For the 2020 season, the team was captained by Dasun Shanaka and coached by Owais Shah. Based in Dambulla, Central Province, Sri Lanka, the team is owned by Bollywood film actor and producer Sachiin J. Joshi. In the inaugural season, it changed its name from Dambulla Hawks to Dambulla Lions, and ten days later again changed its name to Dambulla Viiking.

The team qualified for the semi-finals of this inaugural season of LPL after winning five out of eight matches, but lost to Jaffna Stallions in the semi-finals.

Season summary
In the Dambulla Viiking's first-ever LPL game, against the Kandy Tuskers, they scored 195/4 of their 20 overs. The game was shortened by rain, with the Viiking winning by four runs according to DLS. In their second match, they played against the Jaffna Stallions, who scored 218/7 thanks to Stallions captain Thisara Perera, who scored an unbeaten 97 runs. The Viikings could not chase the total down, losing by 66 runs.

In their third match, they played against the Colombo Kings. The Kings' batting fluctuated, as they were bowled out for 149 runs in response to the Viiking's 175 runs. This brought the Kings' unbeaten run to an end. In Game 4 they competed against the Kandy Tuskers. The Tuskers made 156 runs with a loss of 6 wickets. In response to the Viiking's 157/7, winning the game by 5 wickets.

The Viiking's Game 5, against the Galle Gladiators, was a much closer affair. Niroshan Dickwella hit 60 runs. In response, Gladiators' batsman Danushka Gunathilaka hit his third fifty in a row and he was well supported by wicket-keeper batsman Azam Khan, who also hit a fifty. However, the Viiking won this time by 9 runs. Game 6 was a washout, with the Viiking at 42/3 before the rain hit.

In Game 7 against Galle, the Viiking's chances looked slim before Samiullah Shinwari's 46 runs off 20 balls helped the Viikings chase down the target of 168 runs. In the last game of the group stage against the Colombo Kings, Kings player Qais Ahmed performed with both bat and ball. He first took two wickets by giving 23 runs from his 4 overs before hitting 50 runs off 22 balls, and defeated Viiking with a 6 wickets loss. This meant that the Dambulla Viiking finished 2nd on the table.

Viiking played against the Stallions in the second semi-finals, but lost the match by a margin of 37 runs.

Squad

Administration and support staff
Bollywood actor and producer Sachiin J. Joshi owns the Dambulla Viiking team. For the season, former English cricketer Owais Shah was appointed as the head coach of team.

Season standings

League table

Matches

Statistics

Most runs
The top scorer of Dambulla Viiking was Dasun Shanaka, who scored 278 runs in nine matches. The second position was attained by Niroshan Dickwella, who scored 270 runs. The third and fourth positions were attained by Angelo Perera and Upul Tharanga, respectively, and the fifth position was held by English cricketer Samit Patel.

Most wickets
Anwar Ali, a Pakistani cricketer who took nine wickets in eight matches, was followed by Malinda Pushpakumara, who took eight wickets. Ramesh Mendis and Kasun Rajitha both took six wickets.

Awards and achievements
Dambulla Viiking won five matches, so five man of the match awards were given to the team's players. The first award was presented to Dasun Shanaka for scoring 73 runs off 37 balls, and he also won the second award. The third award was presented to Angelo Perera for scoring 67 runs off 49 balls. The fourth award was bestowed to Pakistani cricketer Anwar Ali for picking up three wickets, and the last award was awarded to Afghan cricketer Samiullah Shinwari.

References

2020 Lanka Premier League